"Tonight" is a song by drum and bass DJ, producer and musician Danny Byrd featuring fellow Hospital Records artist Netsky. It is the fourth single released from his third album Rave Digger. The song was released on 6 February 2011 for digital download and on 12" vinyl on 7 February 2011. The single peaked at number 91 on the UK Singles Chart and number 11 on the UK Dance Chart. It also got featured in Need for Speed: The Run for the Wii and Nintendo 3DS.

Track listings

Chart performance

Release history

References

External links

2011 singles
Danny Byrd songs
Netsky (musician) songs
Songs written by Danny Byrd
2010 songs
Hospital Records singles